André Robert Breton (19 February 1896 – 28 September 1966) was a French writer and poet, the co-founder, leader, and principal theorist of surrealism. His writings include the first Surrealist Manifesto (Manifeste du surréalisme) of 1924, in which he defined surrealism as "pure psychic automatism".

Along with his role as leader of the surrealist movement he is the author of celebrated books such as Nadja and L'Amour fou. Those activities, combined with his critical and theoretical work on writing and the plastic arts, made André Breton a major figure in twentieth-century French art and literature.

Biography
André Breton was the only son born to a family of modest means in Tinchebray (Orne) in Normandy, France. His father, Louis-Justin Breton, was a policeman and atheistic, and his mother, Marguerite-Marie-Eugénie Le Gouguès, was a former seamstress. Breton attended medical school, where he developed a particular interest in mental illness. His education was interrupted when he was conscripted for World War I.

During World War I, he worked in a neurological ward in Nantes, where he met the Alfred Jarry devotee Jacques Vaché, whose anti-social attitude and disdain for established artistic tradition influenced Breton considerably. Vaché committed suicide when aged 23, and his war-time letters to Breton and others were published in a volume entitled Lettres de guerre (1919), for which Breton wrote four introductory essays.

Breton married his first wife, Simone Kahn, on 15 September 1921. The couple relocated to rue Fontaine  42 in Paris on 1 January 1922. The apartment on rue Fontaine (in the Pigalle district) became home to Breton's collection of more than 5,300 items: modern paintings, drawings, sculptures, photographs, books, art catalogs, journals, manuscripts, and works of popular and Oceanic art. Like his father, he was an atheist.

From Dada to Surrealism
Breton launched the review Littérature in 1919, with Louis Aragon and Philippe Soupault. He also associated with Dadaist Tristan Tzara. In 1924, he was instrumental in the founding of the Bureau of Surrealist Research.

In Les Champs Magnétiques (The Magnetic Fields), a collaboration with Soupault, he implemented the principle of automatic writing. He published the Surrealist Manifesto in 1924, and was editor of the magazine La Révolution surréaliste from that year on. A group of writers became associated with him: Soupault, Louis Aragon, Paul Éluard, René Crevel, Michel Leiris, Benjamin Péret, Antonin Artaud, and Robert Desnos.

Eager to combine the themes of personal transformation found in the works of Arthur Rimbaud with the politics of Karl Marx, Breton joined the French Communist Party in 1927, from which he was expelled in 1933. Nadja, a novel about his encounter with an imaginative woman who later became mentally ill, was published in 1928. Breton celebrated the concept of Mad Love, and many women joined the surrealist group over the years. Toyen was a good friend. During this time, he survived mostly by the sale of paintings from his art gallery.

In December 1929, a new book by Breton appeared, the Second manifeste du surréalisme (Second manifesto of surrealism), which contained a phrase often quoted and reproached to Breton, in particular by Albert Camus: "The simplest surrealist act consists, with revolvers in hand, of descending into the street and shooting at random, as much as possible, into the crowd. » Marguerite Bonnet notes that a very similar phrase already appeared in an article published in 1925 in number 2 of La Révolution surréaliste and that it had not, in its time, caught the attention.

In reaction to the Second manifesto, writers and artists published in 1930 a collective collection of pamphlets against Breton, entitled (in allusion to an earlier title by Breton) Un Cadavre. The authors were members of the surrealist movement who were insulted by Breton or had otherwise disbelieved in his leadership. The pamphlet criticized Breton's oversight and influence over the movement. It marked a divide amidst the early surrealists. Georges Limbour and Georges Ribemont-Dessaignes commented on the sentence where shooting at random in the crowd is described as the simplest surrealist act. Limbour saw in it an example of buffoonery and shamelessness and Ribemont-Dessaignes called Breton a hypocrite, a cop and a priest.

After the publication of this pamphlet against Breton, the Manifesto had a second edition, where Breton added in a note: "this act which I say is the simplest, it is clear that my intention is not to recommend it among all because it is simple and to quarrel with me on this subject amounts to bourgeoisly asking any non-conformist why he does not commit suicide, to any revolutionary why he is not going to live in the USSR”.

In 1935, there was a conflict between Breton and the Soviet writer and journalist Ilya Ehrenburg during the first International Congress of Writers for the Defense of Culture, which opened in Paris in June. Breton had been insulted by Ehrenburg—along with all fellow surrealists—in a pamphlet which said, among other things, that surrealists were "pederasts". Breton slapped Ehrenburg several times on the street, which resulted in surrealists being expelled from the Congress. René Crevel, who according to Salvador Dalí was "the only serious communist among surrealists", was isolated from Breton and other surrealists, who were unhappy with Crevel because of his bisexuality and annoyed with communists in general.

In 1938, Breton accepted a cultural commission from the French government to travel to Mexico. After a conference at the National Autonomous University of Mexico about surrealism, Breton stated after getting lost in Mexico City (as no one was waiting for him at the airport) "I don't know why I came here. Mexico is the most surrealist country in the world".

However, visiting Mexico provided the opportunity to meet Leon Trotsky. Breton and other surrealists traveled via a long boat ride from Patzcuaro to the town of Erongarícuaro. Diego Rivera and Frida Kahlo were among the visitors to the hidden community of intellectuals and artists. Together, Breton and Trotsky wrote the Manifesto for an Independent Revolutionary Art (published under the names of Breton and Diego Rivera) calling for "complete freedom of art", which was becoming increasingly difficult with the world situation of the time.

World War II and exile
Breton was again in the medical corps of the French Army at the start of World War II. The Vichy government banned his writings as "the very negation of the national revolution" and Breton escaped, with the help of the American Varian Fry and Hiram "Harry" Bingham IV, to the United States and the Caribbean during 1941. He emigrated to New York City and lived there for a few years. In 1942, Breton organized a groundbreaking surrealist exhibition at Yale University.

In 1942, Breton collaborated with artist Wifredo Lam on the publication of Breton's poem "Fata Morgana", which was illustrated by Lam.

Breton got to know Martinican writer Aimé Césaire, and later composed the introduction to the 1947 edition of Césaire's Cahier d'un retour au pays natal. During his exile in New York City he met Elisa Bindhoff, the Chilean woman who would become his third wife.

In 1944, he and Elisa traveled to the Gaspé Peninsula in Québec, where he wrote Arcane 17, a book which expresses his fears of World War II, describes the marvels of the Percé Rock and the extreme northeastern part of North America, and celebrates his new romance with Elisa.

During his visit to Haiti in 1945–46, he sought to connect surrealist politics and automatist practices with the legacies of the Haitian Revolution and the ritual practices of Vodou possession. Recent developments in Haitian painting were central to his efforts, as can be seen from a comment that Breton left in the visitors' book at the Centre d'Art in Port-au-Prince: "Haitian painting will drink the blood of the phoenix. And, with the epaulets of [Jean-Jacques] Dessalines, it will ventilate the world." Breton was specifically referring to the work of painter and Vodou priest Hector Hyppolite, whom he identified as the first artist to directly depict Vodou scenes and the lwa (Vodou deities), as opposed to hiding them in chromolithographs of Catholic saints or invoking them through impermanent vevé (abstracted forms drawn with powder during rituals). Breton's writings on Hyppolite were undeniably central to the artist's international status from the late 1940s on, but the surrealist readily admitted that his understanding of Hyppolite's art was inhibited by their lack of a common language. Returning to France with multiple paintings by Hyppolite, Breton integrated this artwork into the increased surrealist focus on the occult, myth, and magic.

Breton's sojourn in Haiti coincided with the overthrow of the country's president, Élie Lescot, by a radical protest movement. Breton's visit was warmly received by La Ruche, a youth journal of revolutionary art and politics, which in January 1946 published a talk given by Breton alongside a commentary which Breton described as having "an insurrectional tone". The issue concerned was suppressed by the government, sparking a student strike, and two days later, a general strike: Lescot was toppled a few days later. Among the figures associated with both La Ruche and the instigation of the revolt were the painter and photographer Gérald Bloncourt and the writers René Depestre and Jacques Stephen Alexis. In subsequent interviews Breton downplayed his personal role in the unrest, stressing that "the misery, and thus, the patience of the Haitian people, were at the breaking point" at the time and stating that "it would be absurd to say that I alone incited the fall of the government". Michael Löwy has argued that the lectures that Breton gave during his time in Haiti resonated with the youth associated with La Ruche and the student movement, resulting in them "plac(ing) them as a banner on their journal" and "t(aking) hold of them as they would a weapon". Löwy has identified three themes in Breton's talks which he believes would have struck a particular chord with the audience, namely surrealism's faith in youth, Haiti's revolutionary heritage, and a quote from Jacques Roumain extolling the revolutionary potential of the Haitian masses.

Later life

Breton returned to Paris in 1946, where he opposed French colonialism (for example as a signatory of the Manifesto of the 121 against the Algerian War) and continued, until his death, to foster a second group of surrealists in the form of expositions or reviews (La Brèche, 1961–65). In 1959, he organized an exhibit in Paris.

By the end of World War II, André Breton decided to embrace anarchism explicitly. In 1952, Breton wrote "It was in the black mirror of anarchism that surrealism first recognised itself." Breton consistently supported the francophone Anarchist Federation and he continued to offer his solidarity after the Platformists around founder and Secretary General Georges Fontenis transformed the FA into the Fédération communiste libertaire.

Like a small number of intellectuals during the time of the Algerian War, he continued to support the FCL when it was forced to go underground, even providing shelter to Fontenis, who was in hiding. He refused to take sides in the politically divided French anarchist movement, even though both he and Péret expressed solidarity to the new Anarchist Federation rebuilt by a group of synthesist anarchists. He also worked with the FA in the Anti-Fascist Committees in the 1960s.

André Breton died at the age of 70 in 1966, and was buried in the Cimetière des Batignolles in Paris.

Legacy

Breton as a collector
Breton was an avid collector of art, ethnographic material, and unusual trinkets. He was particularly interested in materials from the northwest coast of North America. During a financial crisis he experienced in 1931, most of his collection (along with that of his friend Paul Éluard) was auctioned. He subsequently rebuilt the collection in his studio and home at 42 rue Fontaine. The collection grew to over 5,300 items: modern paintings, drawings, sculptures, photographs, books, art catalogs, journals, manuscripts, and works of popular and Oceanic art.

French anthropologist Claude Lévi-Strauss endorsed Breton's skill in authentication based on their time together in 1940s New York.

After Breton's death on 28 September 1966, his third wife, Elisa, and his daughter, Aube, allowed students and researchers access to his archive and collection. After thirty-six years, when attempts to establish a surrealist foundation to protect the collection were opposed, the collection was auctioned by Calmels Cohen at Drouot-Richelieu. A wall of the apartment is preserved at the Centre Georges Pompidou.

Nine previously unpublished manuscripts, including the Manifeste du surréalisme, were auctioned by Sotheby's in May 2008.

Personal life 

Breton married three times:

 from 1921 to 1931, to Simone Collinet, née Kahn (1897–1980);
 from 1934 to 1943, to Jacqueline Lamba, with whom he had his only child, a daughter, ;
 from 1945 to 1966 (his death), to Elisa Bindhoff Enet.

Works
1919: Mont de Piété – [Literally: Pawn Shop]
1920: S'il Vous Plaît – Published in English as: If You Please
1920: Les Champs magnétiques (with Philippe Soupault) – Published in English as: The Magnetic Fields
1923: Clair de terre – Published in English as: Earthlight
1924: Les Pas perdus – Published in English as: The Lost Steps
1924: Manifeste du surréalisme – Published in English as: Surrealist Manifesto
1924: Poisson soluble – [Literally: Soluble Fish]
1924: Un Cadavre – [Literally: A Corpse]
1926: Légitime défense – [Literally: Legitimate Defense]
1928: Le Surréalisme et la peinture – Published in English as: Surrealism and Painting
1928: Nadja – Published in English as: Nadja
1930: Ralentir travaux (with René Char and Paul Éluard) – [Literally: Slow Down, Men at Work]
1930: Deuxième Manifeste du surréalisme – Published in English as: The Second Manifesto of Surrealism
1930: L'Immaculée Conception (with Paul Éluard) – Published in English as: Immaculate Conception
1931: L'Union libre – [Literally: Free Union]
1932: Misère de la poésie – [Literally: Poetry's Misery]
1932: Le Revolver à cheveux blancs – [Literally: The White-Haired Revolver]
1932: Les Vases communicants – Published in English as: Communicating Vessels
1933: Le Message automatique – Published in English as: The Automatic Message
1934: Qu'est-ce que le Surréalisme? – Published in English as: What Is Surrealism?
1934: Point du Jour – Published in English as: Break of Day
1934: L'Air de l'eau – [Literally: The Air of the Water]
1935: Position politique du surréalisme – [Literally: Political Position of Surrealism]
1936: Au Lavoir noir – [Literally: At the black Washtub]
1936: Notes sur la poésie (with Paul Éluard) – [Literally: Notes on Poetry]
1937: Le Château étoilé – [Literally: The Starry Castle]
1937: L'Amour fou – Published in English as: Mad Love
1938: Trajectoire du rêve – [Literally: Trajectory of Dream]
1938: Dictionnaire abrégé du surréalisme (with Paul Éluard) – [Literally: Abridged Dictionary of Surrealism]
1938: Pour un art révolutionnaire indépendant (with Diego Rivera) – [Literally: For an Independent Revolutionary Art]
1940: Anthologie de l'humour noir – Published in English as: Anthology of Black Humor
1941: "Fata Morgana" – [A long poem included in subsequent anthologies]
1943: Pleine Marge – [Literally: Full Margin] 
1944: Arcane 17 – Published in English as: Arcanum 17
1945: Le Surréalisme et la peinture – Published in English as: Surrealism and Painting
1945: Situation du surréalisme entre les deux guerres – [Literally: Situation of Surrealism between the two wars]
1946: Yves Tanguy
1946: Les Manifestes du surréalisme – Published in English as: Manifestoes of Surrealism
1946: Young Cherry Trees Secured against Hares – Jeunes cerisiers garantis contre les lièvres [Bilingual edition of poems translated by Edouard Roditi] 
1947: Ode à Charles Fourier – Published in English as: Ode To Charles Fourier
1948: Martinique, charmeuse de serpents – Published in English as: Martinique: Snake Charmer
1948: La Lampe dans l'horloge – [Literally: The Lamp in the Clock] 
1948: Poèmes 1919–48 – [Literally: Poems 1919–48]
1949: Flagrant délit – [Literally: Red-handed]
1952 Entretiens – – Published in English as: Conversations: The Autobiography of Surrealism
1953: La Clé des Champs – Published in English as: Free Rein
1954: Farouche à quatre feuilles (with Lise Deharme, Julien Gracq, Jean Tardieu) – [Literally: Four-Leaf Feral]
1955: Les Vases communicants [Expanded edition] – Published in English as: Communicating Vessels
1955: Les Manifestes du surréalisme [Expanded edition] – Published in English as: Manifestoes of Surrealism
1957: L'Art magique – Published in English as: Magical Art
1959: Constellations (with Joan Miró) – Published in English as: Constellations
1961: Le la – [Literally: The A]
1962: Les Manifestes du surréalisme [Expanded edition] – Published in English as: Manifestoes of Surrealism
1963: Nadja [Expanded edition] – Published in English as: Nadja
1965: Le Surréalisme et la peinture [Expanded edition] – Published in English as: Surrealism and Painting
1966: Anthologie de l'humour noir [Expanded edition] – Published in English as: Anthology of Black Humor
1966: Clair de terre – (Anthology of poems 1919–1936). Published in English as: Earthlight
1968: Signe ascendant – (Anthology of poems 1935–1961). [Literally: Ascendant Sign]
1970: Perspective cavalière –  [Literally: Cavalier Perspective]
1988: Breton : Oeuvres complètes, tome 1 – [Literally: Breton: The Complete Works, tome 1]
1992: Breton : Oeuvres complètes, tome 2 – [Literally: Breton: The Complete Works, tome 2]
1999: Breton : Oeuvres complètes, tome 3 – [Literally: Breton: The Complete Works, tome 3]

See also

Anti-art
Hector Hyppolite

References

Further reading
 André Breton: Surrealism and Painting – edited and with an introduction by Mark Polizzotti.
 Manifestoes of Surrealism by André Breton, translated by Richard Seaver and Helen R. Lane.

External links

André Breton's Nadja 
 

1896 births
1966 deaths
Modernist writers
French anarchists
French atheists
French Communist Party members
French surrealist writers
Surrealist poets
French Trotskyists
Dada
Libertarian socialists
French Marxist writers
People from Orne
Writers from Normandy
Burials at Batignolles Cemetery
20th-century French poets
20th-century French novelists
20th-century male writers